"I Thought I Lost You" is a pop rock song performed by both American singer-songwriter and actress Miley Cyrus and actor and singer John Travolta. It was released as a promotional single in 2008. The song was co-written by Cyrus with producer Jeffrey Steele. It was included in the 2008 Disney animated film Bolt, in which Cyrus and Travolta provide the voices of Penny and Bolt. "I Thought I Lost You" was made after filmmakers requested Cyrus to write a song for the film. The lyrics speak of getting lost and getting found.

"I Thought I Lost You" was nominated for Broadcast Film Critics Association Award for Best Song and Golden Globe Award for Best Original Song, but lost both to Bruce Springsteen's "The Wrestler" from The Wrestler (2008). The song's accompanying promotional clip has Cyrus and Travolta performing the song in a recording studio and features clips from Bolt. "I Thought I Lost You" was promoted by few live performances by Cyrus.

Background

Cyrus became involved with Bolt once she was cast as Penny, Bolt's owner. Filmmakers asked Cyrus to write a song for herself and John Travolta, who stars as Bolt. She co-wrote the song with the aid of Jeffrey Steele, who also produced the track, in a short period of time as they had a due date. The film's settings vary in cities throughout the United States, which Cyrus thought she could capture in the song. "Not just make it something that sounds from Hollywood and really produced, but we could add a little country twang to it," she said. Cyrus said the writing process was easy. Before the song's completion, Travolta agreed to sing it, believing "Well, it will be a cute song, whatever it is." After listening to the song, he was surprised at Cyrus' songwriting abilities. "She's really gifted at writing, and she really wanted to write something good for me as the character Bolt, so she went out of her way with her writing partner to come up with something good, and I really think they pulled it off", Travolta told MTV News.

John Lasseter, executive producer of Bolt, decided to make "I Thought I Lost You" the theme for Bolt, since it lyrically summarized the film's plot. He said, "[The song] sums up the theme of this film. You know, a dog and its owner and they both were separated, but they love each other so much — there's such an emotional payoff when these characters get reunited, and I think that's what this song's about." Lasseter thought that solely the song worked, but it worked better for the film. "I Thought I Lost You" is one of two songs on the Bolt soundtrack and was released to Radio Disney to promote Bolt and its accompanying soundtrack.

Composition

"I Thought I Lost You" is a pop rock song and lasts three minutes and thirty-six seconds. Its instrumentation includes electric guitar and piano. The song is set in common time at a moderate rock tempo of 103 beats per minute. The song is sung in the key of E♭ major and Cyrus' vocals span two octaves, from G3 to A♭5. "I Thought I Lost You" follows the chord progression of E♭—A♭sus2. The song's lyrics speak of "getting lost and getting found, with an overarching theme of loyalty."

Critical reception
The song received mixed reception from contemporary critics. William Ruhlmann of AllMusic wrote, "The album begins with a pop/rock song, 'I Thought I Lost You,' which oddly sounds like a love duet between John Travolta, a man in his mid-fifties, and the teenage TV and pop star Miley Cyrus, until it is remembered that Travolta voices the movie's title character, a dog." "I Thought I Lost You" was nominated for the Broadcast Film Critics Association Award for Best Song at the 14th Broadcast Film Critics Association Award, but lost to Bruce Springsteen's "The Wrestler" from The Wrestler (2008). The song was nominated for the Golden Globe Award for Best Original Song at the 66th Golden Globe Awards, but also lost to "The Wrestler". An uncredited reviewer from the Los Angeles Times thought the song could have been nominated for and won the Academy Award for Best Original Song at 81st Academy Awards. However, the reviewer stated that the probability of the event was shattered by "a serious obstacle [solely being used in Bolts ending credits] and lots of Disney competition."

Live performances

A promotional clip premiered on November 3, 2008, on Disney Channel. The video commences with a clip from Bolt in which one of the film's characters, Rhino, shouts "Let it begin!" Then several clips from the film play rapidly until Cyrus and Travolta are shown performing in a recording studio. Throughout the rest of the video, scenes alternate between Cyrus and Travolta performing to clips from Bolt. It ends with Rhino performing a brief dance move.

Cyrus first performed "I Thought I Lost You" live on November 12, 2008, at an outdoor concert televised by Good Morning America. She also performed the track at the 2008 Macy's Thanksgiving Day Parade.

References

External links
 "I Thought I Lost You" promotional clip on MTV

2008 songs
Bolt (franchise)
Miley Cyrus songs
John Travolta songs
Male–female vocal duets
Songs written by Miley Cyrus
Songs written by Jeffrey Steele
Walt Disney Records singles
Disney songs
Songs written for animated films
Animated series theme songs